Sahamamy is a rural municipality in Madagascar. It belongs to the district of Amparafaravola, which is a part of Alaotra-Mangoro Region. The population of the commune is not known, but in 2013 elections there had been 3942 authorized voters.

Geography
This municipality is situated at 15 km North of Amparafaravola. 4 fokontany (villages) belong to this municipality.

Infrastructures
The National Road 3a crosses this municipality.

References

Populated places in Alaotra-Mangoro